Andrea María Milroy Díaz is a Venezuelan pageant titleholder, born in Caracas on 4 April 1984. She was the official representative of Venezuela to the Miss World 2004 pageant held in Sanya, China on 6 December 2004.

Also won the special awards of Best Face and Miss Elegance. She represented Trujillo state.

References

External links
Miss Venezuela Official Website
Miss World Official Website

1984 births
Living people
People from Caracas
Venezuelan female models
Miss Venezuela World winners
Miss World 2004 delegates